Keep It Comin is the third studio album by the American R&B recording artist Keith Sweat. It was released on November 26, 1991, and topped the R&B Albums chart upon its debut, while entering the top 20 of the Billboard 200. It spent three weeks on the former, temporarily knocking Michael Jackson's Dangerous from the top position.

The album's title track, "Keep It Comin'", was Sweat's fourth single to top the R&B chart. Two more singles "I Want To Love You Down" and "Why Me Baby" were Top 20 R&B hits. It features the album cut "There You Go (Tellin' Me No Again)", originally on the New Jack City soundtrack months earlier. On February 21, 1992, Keep It Comin was certified platinum by the Recording Industry Association of America, for shipments of one million copies in the United States.  This was the last album where Sweat collaborated with the longtime new jack swing producer Teddy Riley until Just Me was released 16 years later.

Track listing

Personnel 
Credits for Keep It Comin adapted from Allmusic.

 John Adams – drum programming, keyboards
 Blackjack – drum programming
 Bob Brockman – mixing
 Stanley Brown – arranger, keyboards, multi-instruments, producer
 Keni Burke – arranger, keyboards, producer
 Rodney Carruthers – background vocals
 Phil Castellano – engineer
 Jeff Chestek - engineer
 Bobby Douglas – keyboards
 Michael Evans – mixing
 Jose Fernandez – engineer
 Michael Fossenkemper – engineer
 Hiriam Hicks – executive producer
 Thomas Walter Hilton – background vocals
 John James – background vocals
 Lionel Job – producer
 Joe Public – background vocals
 George Karras – mixing
 David Kennedy – engineer, mixing
 Maurice Lauchner – background vocals

 Emmanuel Rahiem LeBlanc – background vocals
 LL Cool J – rap
 Gregg Mann – engineer, mixing
 Warren McRae – bass guitar
 Mello K. – rap
 Herb Powers – mastering
 Artie Reynolds – synthesizer
 Teddy Riley – drum programming, keyboards
 Tony Ross – background vocals
 Eddison Sansbury – drum programming, engineer, keyboards, mixing, producer
 Michael Scalcione – engineer, mixing
 Vivian Sessoms – background vocals
 Dan Sheehan – engineer
 Silk – background vocals
 Alvin Speights – engineer
 Alton "Wokie" Stewart – keyboards, producer, background vocals
 Keith Sweat – executive producer, producer, vocals, background vocals
 Brian Weber – assistant engineer
 Charlie Wilson – background vocals
 Bobby Wooten – engineer, mixing, multi Instruments, producer, synthesizer

Charts

Weekly charts

Year-end charts

Certifications

See also
List of number-one R&B albums of 1992 (U.S.)

References

External links 
 Keep It Comin' at Discogs

1991 albums
Keith Sweat albums
Albums produced by Teddy Riley
Elektra Records albums